Berkeley is a community on Ontario Highway 10 in the township of Chatsworth, Grey County, Ontario, Canada.

The Berkeley Post Office was opened in 1853. There were three churches in Berkeley: a Presbyterian church, an Anglican church and a United Church. Only the United Church is still standing, although closed at present due to high maintenance expenses.

References

Communities in Grey County